The Aboriginal Heritage Act 2006 (AHA) of the state of Victoria, Australia was enacted "to provide for the protection of Aboriginal cultural heritage in Victoria". It established Registered Aboriginal Parties to act as the "primary guardians, keepers and knowledge holders of Aboriginal cultural heritage". They protect and manage the Aboriginal cultural heritage in Victoria. The Act also established the Victorian Aboriginal Heritage Council and the Victorian Aboriginal Heritage Register, gave powers for Authorised Officers and Aboriginal Heritage Officers, and laid out Cultural Heritage Management Plans (CHMPs) and Cultural Heritage Permit processes, to manage activities that may impact Aboriginal cultural heritage.

The long title for the Bill was "to provide for the protection of Aboriginal cultural heritage in Victoria, to repeal the Archaeological and Aboriginal Relics Preservation Act 1972 and for other purposes". The Act is No. 16 of 2006 and was assented to on 9 May 2006. It was effective from 28 May 2007, and gazetted on 24 May 2007.

Further to the Act, the Aboriginal Heritage Regulations 2018 prescribe standards, set out the circumstances in which a CHMP should be prepared and set fees and charges. The Regulations also define "high impact activities" and "areas of cultural heritage sensitivity".

Objectives

The objectives, stated in Section 3 of the Act, are:

See also
Budj Bim heritage areas
Gunditj Mirring Traditional Owners Aboriginal Corporation

References

Further reading

External links
 PDF (Version 024, effective 6 June 2020)
 (Version 1, effective 23 May 2018, current as of July 2020)

History of Victoria (Australia)
Australian Aboriginal culture
Australian heritage law
Victoria (Australia) legislation
2006 in Australian law
2000s in Victoria (Australia)